Argyrodes cognatus is a species of tangle-web spider that is endemic to the Seychelles, and can be found on Mahé, Conception, Silhouette and Marianne islands. It is found in woodland habitats where it spins orb webs in herbaceous vegetation. It is threatened by habitat deterioration due to invasive plants, especially Cinnamomum verum.

References

Theridiidae
Endemic fauna of Seychelles
Vulnerable animals
Spiders of Africa
Spiders described in 1877